The Composer's Cut Series Vol. III: The Piano is the third in a series of albums, all released on the same day,  by Michael Nyman to feature concert versions of film scores, in this case, Jane Campion's The Piano, and his 53rd release overall.  The collection is more streamlined and has fewer tracks than the soundtrack album, starting and ending with the popular "The Heart Asks Pleasure First."

Track listing
The heart asks pleasure first
The heart asks pleasure second to love
To the edge of the earth
A wild and distant shore
The promise
Here to there
Big my secret
Silver-fingered fling
Lost and found
The embrace
The mood that passes through you
All imperfect things
The wounded
Dreams of a journey
The heart asks pleasure first/The promise

Personnel 
The Michael Nyman Band
 Michael Nyman, piano
 Gabrielle Lester, violin
 Catherine Thompson, violin
 Ian Humphries, violin
 Beverley Davison, violin
 Mia Cooper, violin
 Rebecca Hirsch, violin
 Lizzie Bull, violin
 Morvent Bruce, violin
 Kate Musker, viola
 Joseph Boyd, viola
 John Metcalfe, viola
 Tony Hinnigan, cello
 Robert Max, cello
 Justin Pearson, cello
 Martin Elliott, bass guitar
 David Roach, soprano and alto saxophone
 Simon Haram, soprano and alto saxophone
 Andrew Findon, baritone saxophone, flute, piccolo
 Nigel Barr, bass trombone

References 

2006 albums
Michael Nyman albums